eHealthMe.com is an American medical analysis website launched in 2008. The site provides patients and healthcare professionals with tools to study approximately 1.2 billion drug outcomes, following the release of those drugs onto the market. As of October 2020, the company claims to be monitoring 47,090 drugs and supplements. The company conducts analysis on significant amounts of data from the U.S. Food and Drug Administration (FDA) and the wider community going back to 1977 to provide post-marketing phase information. The services, which help consumers weigh the risks of using or combining drugs, are free and anonymous.

History
eHealthMe was publicly launched in 2008 by Madison, Wisconsin based HealthLatLLC. It was founded by Johnson Chen, who was formerly a healthcare consultant with Deloitte.

Activity
The company carries out independent research, such as the studies into the side effects of statins, specifically occurrences of rhabdomyolysis, in 2008. Patients also use the website for self-reporting adverse drug effects.

References

External links
 eHealthMe.com

Health care companies established in 2008
American medical websites
Internet properties established in 2008
2008 establishments in Wisconsin
Health care companies based in California
Companies based in Mountain View, California